Stubblefield is an unincorporated community in Bond County, Illinois, United States. The community is served by an exit on Interstate 70. The nearest city to Stubblefield is Greenville.

References

Unincorporated communities in Bond County, Illinois
Unincorporated communities in Illinois